The legion, in biological classification, is a non-obligatory taxonomic rank within the Linnaean hierarchy sometimes used in zoology.

Taxonomic rank
In zoological taxonomy, the legion is:
subordinate to the class
superordinate to the cohort. 
consists of a group of related orders

Legions may be grouped into superlegions or subdivided into sublegions, and these again into infralegions.

Use in zoology
Legions and their super/sub/infra groups have been employed in some classifications of birds and mammals. Full use is made of all of these (along with cohorts and supercohorts) in, for example, McKenna and Bell's classification of mammals.

See also 
 Linnaean taxonomy
 Mammal classification

References 

Biology terminology
Taxa by rank
rank08a